The following list includes all effective burghs in Scotland from the coming into force of the Burgh Police (Scotland) Act 1892, in 1893. "Ineffective" burghs, which had not used legislation to adopt a "police system",  take on local government duties and reform their town councils, were abolished on this date.

Burgh is the Scots term for a town or a municipality. It corresponds to the Scandinavian Borg and the English Borough.

Burghs are listed below under the name of the county to which they belonged. The county boundaries used are those effective for local government purposes from circa 1890 until 1975. During this period four burghs were also counties, or counties of cities

Counties of cities
These four burghs were Counties of Cities, being independent from the surrounding counties for all judicial and local government purposes.

Note a:  Royal Burgh of Aberdeen absorbed Aberdeenshire burghs of Old Aberdeen burgh (burgh of barony 1489, police burgh 1860), Woodside (police burgh 1860) in 1891.

Note b:  Royal Burgh of Glasgow absorbed the following Renfrewshire burghs in the years shown:
1846: Gorbals (private act 1808)
1891: Crosshill (police burgh 1871), Govanhill (police burgh 1876), Hillhead (police burgh 1869), Pollokshields (police burgh 1876), Pollokshields East (police burgh 1880)
1905: Kinning Park (police burgh 1871)
1912: Govan (burgh of barony 1607, police burgh 1864), Pollokshaws (burgh of barony 1813, police burgh 1858)

Aberdeenshire 
Note: The royal burgh of Aberdeen was part of this county until 1899.

Angus (also known as Forfarshire)
Note: The royal burgh of Dundee was part of this county until 1894.

‡ Absorbed by Dundee royal burgh 1913

Argyll

Ayrshire

Banffshire

Berwickshire

Buteshire

Caithness

Clackmannanshire

Dumfriesshire

Dunbartonshire

East Lothian (also known as Haddingtonshire)

Edinburghshire 
See Midlothian

Elginshire 
See Morayshire

Fife

† Burghs merged 1929

‡ Dysart absorbed by Kircaldy royal burgh 1930

Forfarshire 
See Angus

Haddingtonshire 
See East Lothian

Inverness-shire

Kincardineshire

Kinross-shire

Kirkcudbrightshire

† Maxwelltown burgh was absorbed by Dumfries royal burgh 1931.

Lanarkshire
Note: The royal burgh of Glasgow was part of the county until 1893.

† Burghs merged 1920

‡ Burghs absorbed by Glasgow royal burgh on dates shown

Linlithgowshire 
See West Lothian

Midlothian (also known as Edinburghshire) 
Note: The royal burgh of Edinburgh and its liberties formed a separate county of itself from the thirteenth century.

† Burghs merged 1920

‡ Burghs absorbed by Edinburgh royal burgh in years shown (Portobello continued, however, as a separate parliamentary burgh until 1918)

Morayshire (also known as Elginshire)

Nairnshire

Orkney

Peeblesshire

Perthshire

† Burghs merged 1930

Renfrewshire

† Burghs absorbed by Glasgow royal burgh on dates shown

Ross and Cromarty (Ross-shire and Cromartyshire)

Roxburghshire

Selkirkshire

Stirlingshire

Sutherland

West Lothian (also known as Linlithgowshire)

Wigtownshire

Zetland

References

See also 
 Burgh
 List of towns and cities in Scotland by population
 List of UK place names with royal patronage
 List of towns in England, Northern Ireland, Republic of Ireland, Wales
 List of cities in the United Kingdom
 District of burghs

 List of burghs in Scotland
Burghs in Scotland
Scotland
Bur